The 2016–17 Sacramento State Hornets women's basketball team represented California State University, Sacramento during the 2016–17 NCAA Division I women's basketball season. The Hornets, led by fourth year head coach Bunky Harkleroad and played their home games at Hornets Nest. They were members of the Big Sky Conference. They finished the season 10–20, 6–12 in Big Sky play to finish in a tie for eighth place. They lost in the first round of the Big Sky women's tournament where they lost to Weber State.

Roster

Schedule

|-
!colspan=9 style="background:#004840; color:#B39650;"| Exhibition

|-
!colspan=9 style="background:#004840; color:#B39650;"| Non-conference regular season

|-
!colspan=9 style="background:#004840; color:#B39650;"| Big Sky regular season

|-
!colspan=9 style="background:#004840; color:#B39650;"| Big Sky Women's Tournament

See also
2016–17 Sacramento State Hornets men's basketball team

References

Sacramento State Hornets women's basketball seasons
Sacramento State